Henry Gassaway Davis (November 16, 1823 – March 11, 1916) was a millionaire and Senator from West Virginia. He was the Democratic Party's nominee for Vice President of the United States in 1904.

Born on a farm in Howard County, Maryland, he became a railroad executive before branching out into coal mining and banking as founder of the Potomac and Piedmont Coal and Railway Company. Davis won election to both houses of the West Virginia Legislature before serving as U.S. Senator from 1871 to 1883. His younger brother, Thomas Beall Davis, also served in Congress. After his tenure in the Senate ended, Davis continued to grow his business interests. In partnership with son-in-law, Stephen Benton Elkins, Davis created the Davis Coal and Coke Company and led it to become one of the largest coal companies in the world.

The 1904 Democratic National Convention nominated a ticket of Alton B. Parker for president and Davis for vice president. Davis was chosen primarily for his ability to provide funding to the campaign. At nearly 81 years old, he remains the oldest person to ever serve on a major party's national ticket. The Republican ticket of Theodore Roosevelt and Charles W. Fairbanks prevailed by a wide margin. After the election, Davis helped establish Davis & Elkins College, and he died in 1916.

Biography

Early life

Henry Gassaway Davis was born near Woodstock, Howard County, Maryland, the son of Louisa Warfield (née Brown; March 10, 1799 – July 23, 1868) and merchant Caleb Dorsey Davis (March 3, 1792 – September 4, 1850). He was the great-great-great-grandson of Maryland pioneer Thomas Davis, and the great-great-great-great-grandson of Maryland politician and justice Colonel Nicholas Gassaway, both of whom were of Welsh ancestry and emigrated to Maryland in the mid 17th century.

Stage coaches stopped at Woodstock five days a week en route to Washington, D.C., and Davis later often recalled one of his earliest memories: witnessing the groundbreaking of the country's first railroad on July 4, 1828, from atop his father's shoulders in Baltimore.

Davis had three brothers and a sister. His father's business prospered until he won a contract to grade a section of road between Baltimore and Frederick, Maryland, which caused heavy losses. Creditors caused even the family's horses and carriages to be sold, which proved devastating to Caleb Davis's health.

Early career through the Civil War

When his family's finances collapsed, Davis (then 15 years old) abandoned his education and took a job carrying water for workmen at a nearby quarry, then became caretaker of "Waverly" a nearby farm own by Governor Howard. When Davis was 20, the B&O completed track from Frederick to Cumberland, and needed men to run the trains and handle cargo. Thus Davis went to work for the Baltimore and Ohio Railroad as a brakeman. His hard work and enthusiasm drew the attention of the railroad's president, Thomas Swann, who promoted him to freight conductor, then passenger conductor. Davis met many statesmen, including Senators Henry Clay of Kentucky (whom Davis came to admire and received invitations to visit at his home), Thomas H. Benton of Missouri, Lewis Cass of Michigan, Benjamin Wade and Thomas Corwin of Ohio, and Stephen A. Douglas of Illinois—all of whom embarked the B&O train in Cumberland to reach Washington, D.C. (or disembarked on the reverse route). Davis also often stayed at a hotel in Washington between trips, and conversed with other notables, including Senators William C. Rives of Virginia, John C. Calhoun of South Carolina, and Daniel Webster of Massachusetts.
When the B&O finally completed track to Wheeling on the navigable Ohio River, Davis was put in charge of the Piedmont station. It was a crucial station because it was at the foot of a mountain, where trains traveling eastward added engines to surmount the slope. Until the railroad completed a house for him (so his new wife could join him), Davis lived in a box car, and also came to admire the natural landscape of the Allegheny Mountains. After four years, his brother Thomas joined him, and they established a store, often trading farm products for manufactured goods such as jeans, shoes, calico and sugar. In 1858, Davis resigned his railroad job to concentrate on the firm, Henry G. Davis & Company.

Davis also explored the Alleghenies, particularly the area drained by the Potomac River to the east and the Cheat River on the western side of the eastern continental divide. He purchased land rich in timber or coal (often for $1 an acre). He soon built sawmills to process the lumber and extended branch railroads to new coal mines, and also invested in banking in Piedmont.

When the Civil War began, even the B & O's President, John Work Garrett initially sympathized with the Southern cause. However, the B&O was crucial for the Union armies. Davis favored the Union and also admired the new President Abraham Lincoln. When Confederate raiders attacked the B&O and destroyed track and bridges, part of Davis' job was to restore service and keep the supplies moving. Many in western Virginia likewise favored the Union, and met in two Wheeling Conventions, then adopted a statehood referendum and constitution, eventually becoming the 35th state. In 1865, Davis would be elected to the West Virginia House of Delegates as one of Hampshire County's representatives.

Personal  life

On February 22, 1853, in Frederick County, Maryland. Davis married Katherine Ann Salome Bantz. Henry and Katherine had eight children, three of whom died in infancy. Seven of their eight children have been identified, as follows:
 
(1) - Mary Louise "Hallie" Davis (December 9, 1854 – March 1, 1933) (Her married name was Hallie Davis Elkins) - She married industrialist and politician Stephen Benton Elkins (September 26, 1841 – January 4, 1911) on April 14, 1875, in Baltimore. Hallie Davis was Stephen's second wife, his first wife having died in 1872. Stephen Elkins had married Sarah Simms "Sallie" Jacobs (1845 – October 1872) on June 10, 1866, and had two children by her. His marriage with Hallie Davis produced five children. Elkins, a Republican, would become his father-in-law's protege and business partner and die 22 years before his wife.
(2) - Kate Bantz Davis (December 1, 1856 – January 21, 1903)
(3) - Anderson Cord Davis (born January 14, 1865) (twin) (died in infancy)
(4) - Ada Kate Davis (born January 14, 1865) (twin) (died in infancy)
(5) - Grace Thomas Davis (October 19, 1869 – 1931) (a.k.a. Gracie Davis)
(6) - Henry Gassaway Davis Jr. (May 1871 – April 24, 1896) (a.k.a. Harry Davis)
(7) - John Thomas Davis (March 31, 1874 – June 27, 1935)

Political and commercial life
In 1865 Davis was elected a member of the West Virginia House of Delegates. The following year, he founded the Potomac and Piedmont Coal and Railway Company with the intent of furnishing transportation to his coal mining and timbering interests. The company was given the right to construct railroad grades in Mineral, Grant, Tucker and Randolph counties. He became a state senator in 1869. In 1870, he was elected to the United States Senate, serving two terms, with his service ending in 1883.

Following his service in the Senate, Davis retired to Elkins, West Virginia, where he resumed banking and coal mining.  Davis’ company now controlled , employed 1,600 men of sixteen nationalities, operated two power plants, and worked over 1,000 coke ovens and 9 mines within one mile (1.6 km) of the central office at Coketon in Tucker County. By 1892, the Davis Coal and Coke Company, a partnership between Davis and his son-in-law, Senator Stephen Benton Elkins, was among the largest coal companies in the world.

Davis represented the U.S. at the Pan-American Conferences of 1889 and 1901.

Candidate for Vice President
In 1904, Davis became the Democratic nominee for vice president on a ticket with Alton B. Parker. Parker and Davis lost to the Republican ticket of Theodore Roosevelt and Charles Fairbanks by a wide margin. At the age of 80, Davis was and remains the oldest person to be nominated for president or vice president on a major party ticket. He was chosen primarily because of his ability to provide much needed funds to the campaign.

Later years
Davis in his last years acted as chairman of the permanent Pan American Railway Committee (1901–1916) and also donated land to build Davis and Elkins College in  Elkins, West Virginia. He died in Washington, D.C., on March 11, 1916, at the age of 92. He was interred in the Maplewood Cemetery in Elkins. A bronze equestrian statue of Davis was erected in 1927, at Sycamore Street and Randolph Avenue in Elkins, with an identical twin in Davis Park in downtown Charleston, West Virginia.

Legacy

Davis and Elkins College, in Elkins, WV; named for Senators Davis and Elkins
Graceland (Elkins, West Virginia); the summer home for Davis and a National Historic Landmark
Henry Gassaway Davis House; Davis' home at Piedmont, West Virginia, built in 1871
He is the namesake of the town of Gassaway, West Virginia
He is the namesake for Davis, West Virginia

References

External links
 The West Virginia & Regional History Center at West Virginia University houses the papers of Henry G. Davis in three collections, A&M 13, A&M 717, and A&M 1028

Further reading
Williams, John Alexander. West Virginia and the Captains of Industry (1976)
Williams, John Alexander. "Davis and Elkins of West Virginia: businessmen in politics" (PhD dissertation, Yale University, 1967)  ProQuest Dissertations Publishing,  1967. 6708432.

|-

|-

1823 births
1916 deaths
19th-century American railroad executives
American energy industry executives
American people of Welsh descent
Burials in West Virginia
Businesspeople from West Virginia
Davis and Elkins family
Democratic Party United States senators from West Virginia
Democratic Party (United States) vice presidential nominees
Democratic Party members of the West Virginia House of Delegates
People from Elkins, West Virginia
People from Woodstock, Maryland
People from Piedmont, West Virginia
1904 United States vice-presidential candidates
Democratic Party West Virginia state senators
Davis & Elkins College